Suzy is a feminine given name, usually a short form (hypocorism) of Suzanne, Susan, etc. People named Suzy include:

People 
 Suzy Aitchison (born 1960), English television actress
 Suzy Batkovic (born 1980), Australian basketball player
 Suzy Becker (born 1962), American author, illustrator, entrepreneur, educator, and social activist
 Susan Suzy Bogguss (born 1956), American country music singer and songwriter
 Suzy Bloom, film/stage actress
 Suzy Bofia (born 1984), Cameroonian collegiate basketball player
 Susan Suzy Amis Cameron (born 1962), American environmental advocate and former actress and model
 Suzy Carrier (1922–1999), French film actress
 Suzy Castor (born 1936), Haitian historian, educator, and human rights activist
 Suzanne Suzy Cato (born 1968), Australian-born New Zealand children's entertainer on television
 Suzy McKee Charnas (born 1939), Hugo Award-winning American science fiction and fantasy writer
 Suzanne Suzy Chaffee (born 1946), American former Olympic alpine ski racer and actress
 Suzy Clarkson, author and former New Zealand television personality
 Suzy Davies, Welsh Conservative Party politician
 Suzy Delair (born 1917), French actress and singer
 Suzy Kellems Dominik, American artist, publisher, arts and culture correspondent, socialite, and arts patron
 Suzy Frelinghuysen (1911–1988), also known as Suzy Morris, American abstract painter and opera singer
 Suzy Gorman (born 1962), American photographer based in St. Louis
 Suzy Favor Hamilton (born 1968), American former middle-distance runner
 Suzy Hotrod (born 1980), roller derby skater
 Suzy Jones (born 1948), American former competition swimmer
 Suzy Kendall (born 1944), British actress born Freda Harrison
 Suzanne Suzy Klein (born 1975), British writer and BBC radio and TV presenter
 Suzanne Suzy Kolber (born 1964), American reporter, producer and sportscaster
 Suzy Kline (born 1943), author
 Suzy Lake (born 1947), American-Canadian artist
 Suzy Lawlor (born 1984), Irish actress
 Suzy Lee (born 1974), children's book illustrator and author
 Suzy Lishman (born 1967/8), President of the British Royal College of Pathologists
 Suzy Menkes (born 1943), British journalist and fashion critic
 Suzy Merchant (born 1969), basketball coach
 Suzy Miller, British model, actress, dancer, and choreographer
 Suzy Patterson (born 1961), actress
 Cecilia Suzy Parker (1932–2003), American model and actress
 Suzy Petty (born 1992), English field hockey player
 Suzy Pierson (1902–1996), French film actress
 Suzy Prim (1896–1991), French actress
 Suzy Shortland (born 1974), former New Zealand female rugby union representative
 Suzy Solidor (1900–1983), French singer and actress born Suzanne Marion
 Suzy Spafford (born 1945), American cartoonist
 Suzy Spencer (born 1954), American author and journalist
 Suzy Styles, psychologist
 Suzy Varty, noted British comics artist, writer, and editor
 Suzy Welch (born 1959), American author, television commentator, business journalist and public speaker, wife of business executive Jack Welch
 Suzy Whaley (born c. 1967), American professional golfer, first woman to qualify for and win a PGA tournament

Characters 
 Suzy Branning, a fictional character from the BBC One soap opera EastEnders
 Suzy Homemaker, a line of miniature functional toy household appliances
 "Suzy Snowflake", a song and titular character
 Suzy Sheep, a character from Peppa Pig
 Suzy Johnson, a fictional character from the Disney animated series Phineas and Ferb

See also 
 Suzie
 Suzy (disambiguation)

Feminine given names
Hypocorisms